Adrian Anthony Madaschi (born 11 July 1982) is an Australian footballer who last played for Perth SC. He is a left-footed defender whose position is centre-back and can also play full-back.

Club career 
Madaschi was born in Perth, Western Australia. He left Perth Italia to join Italian Serie A side Atalanta's youth team at the age of 15 in 1998. Madaschi was part of the Atalanta youth side that won back to back Primavera Coppa Italia (Italian Youth Cups) in 1999–00 and 2000–01, along with losing the Italian Scudetto (Youth Championship final) to Inter in 2000–01. He was loaned out to Monza in July 2001, but in the January 2002 window was re-called back to Atalanta to the first team squad.

Adrian constantly made first team squads at Atalanta, but could never break into the then Serie A team. He was again loaned out by Atalanta to Pistoiese for the 2002–03 season. But again, did not see much first team action.

In October 2003, after mutually agreeing to terminate his contract with Atalanta B.C a year in advance, Adrian signed for Partick Thistle in the Scottish Premier League. Unfortunately, even prior to Madaschi's arrival, Partick were doomed for relegation that season to the Scottish First Division. Madaschi though, got regular First Team Football, playing 24 matches and scoring 2 goals in his debut Scottish season in the SPL and 27 appearances and 2 goals in the following season in the First Division. Madaschi left the club in May 2005, to join Dundee for the 2005–06 First Division season. Adrian had to leave the club at the start of December 2005 to cure a recurring osteitis pubis injury back in Australia.

Madaschi returned to Italy to join Grosseto in January 2006 and remained at the club until the end of that season. He then joined Portosummaga in the 2006–07 season. In the 2007–08 season, Madaschi and Portosummaga achieved promotion to Lega Pro Divisione 1 where the club has maintained its status.

The end of the 2009–10 season saw Portogruaro-Summaga finish champions of the Lega Pro division 1, beating Hellas Verona in the final game of the season 1–0 to guarantee automatic Promotion to Serie B. Madaschi was named in the Lega Pro, team of the year as a centre Bback.

Portogruaro-Summaga struggled during the 2010–11 season in Serie B and was relegated back to Lega Pro, Following their relegation Madaschi travelled back to Melbourne, Australia and played for Melbourne Heart in a largely successful 10 game injury replacement before heading to Asia.

On 16 January 2012, Madaschi joined South Korean outfit Jeju United. At the end of the 2013–14 season Adrian returned home to Perth. Citing a lack of interest from the A-League, he signed for local club Perth SC where he went on to make just three appearances before being snapped up by Newcastle Jets on 6 June 2014. He was reportedly sacked from the club by owner Nathan Tinkler, following a player revolt midway through the 2014–15 A-League season.

On 20 March 2015, he signed for Western Sydney Wanderers as an injury replacement for Nick Ward.

International career 
Madaschi was centre back for the Joeys at the 1999 FIFA U-17 World Cup in New Zealand where Australia lost on penalties to Brazil in the final, to finish runner up for the tournament. Madaschi was elected in the FIFA Top 11 team of the Tournament.

He also started all four games in defence for the Young Socceroos played at the 2001 FIFA U-20 World Cup in Argentina.

In 2004, Adrian was in the centre of defence for the 'Olyroos' (The Australian Olympic Football Team) at Athens.

Earlier that year in May and June 2004, Adrian Madaschi was capped four times for the Socceroos during the Second Stage of Qualifiers for the 2006 World Cup. He scored two goals, as part of a 6–1 victory over Fiji, in his second match for Australia.

In May 2009, Madaschi was named in a 30-man Socceroos squad for the team's last three 2010 World Cup qualifiers.

On 12 August 2009, Madaschi earned another full international cap, playing the second half in the Socceroos 3–0 victory over the Republic of Ireland in Limerick.

Honours 
Australia U17
 FIFA U-17 World Championship: 1999 (runners-up)

Australia
 OFC Nations Cup: 2004

References

External links 
 OzFootball profile
 
 

1982 births
Living people
Soccer players from Perth, Western Australia
Association football defenders
Australian soccer players
Australian expatriate soccer players
Australian people of Italian descent
Australian people of Scottish descent
Australia international soccer players
Olympic soccer players of Australia
Footballers at the 2004 Summer Olympics
Scottish Premier League players
A.C. Monza players
U.S. Pistoiese 1921 players
Dundee F.C. players
Partick Thistle F.C. players
F.C. Grosseto S.S.D. players
Melbourne City FC players
Western Sydney Wanderers FC players
Jeju United FC players
Newcastle Jets FC players
Serie B players
Expatriate footballers in Scotland
Expatriate footballers in Italy
Expatriate footballers in South Korea
Australian expatriate sportspeople in Scotland
Australian expatriate sportspeople in Italy
Australian expatriate sportspeople in South Korea
A-League Men players
K League 1 players
National Premier Leagues players